With Babies and Banners: Story of the Women's Emergency Brigade is a 1979 documentary film directed by Lorraine Gray about the General Motors sit-down strike in 1936–1937 that focuses uniquely on the role of women using archival footage and interviews. It provides an inside look at women's roles in the strike. It was nominated for an Academy Award for Best Documentary Feature.

The film was one of the first to put together archival footage with contemporary interviews of participants and helped spur a series of films on left and labor history in the US utilizing this technique. The film was also important in helping bring into view the history of American women being active in the public sphere, particularly in union and labor actions. The film was, further, ground breaking because it was produced and directed by  women.

Principal cast
Genora Johnson Dollinger
Delia Parish
Nellie Besson Hendrix
Mary Handa
Babe Gelles
Helen Hauer
Liliian Hatcher
Laura Hayward
Teeter Walker

References

External links

1979 films
1979 documentary films
American documentary films
Documentary films about feminism
Documentary films about labor relations in the United States
Films about activists
1970s English-language films
1970s American films